Said Nurmagomedov (born April 5, 1992) is a Russian mixed martial artist, currently competing as a bantamweight in the Ultimate Fighting Championship. A professional competitor since 2009, he formerly competed for Absolute Championship Berkut and World Fighting Championship Akhmat. He is a former AFC Bantamweight Champion.

Mixed martial arts career

Early career
Said Nurmagomedov made his professional MMA debut in 2009 at World Ultimate Full Contact 15, facing the undefeated 4–0 Oscar Nave. He won the bout in the first round by way of an armbar. After a three year break, he returned in 2012 at Vale Tudo 3 to fight the debuting Jolon Uulu Jayloobay. Said won the fight in the first round by way of an armbar. Said returned in 2013 to welcome another debutante, Akhmed Sarapov, at Liga Kavkaz - Battle in Khiv 1. Nurmagomedov scored the first KO win of his career, ending the fight in the dying seconds of the first round.

In 2014 Nurmagomedov signed with Absolute Championship Berkut, with his first fight being against the experienced Asulan Toktarbaev, at ACB 1 bantamweight Grand Prix. Said won a unanimous decision. In the next round of the bantamweight Grand Prix, at ACB 4 he faced Magomed-Emin Khazhgeriev, again winning by a unanimous decision. In the penultimate bout of the Grand Prix, at ACB 7, he fought against the undefeated German Barsegyan. He won by TKO, after the doctor stopped the fight in the first round. In the final of the Grand Prix, Nurmagomedov faced the undefeated Magomed Bibulatov, losing the final by a unanimous decision.

He would then move to World Fighting Championship Akhmat two years later, with his first fight being against the veteran Diego Marlon, winning a unanimous decision. At WFCA 22 he would face Walter Pereira Jr, winning a unanimous decision. He fought against Abdul-Rakhman Dudaev during WFA 30 for the vacant AFC Bantamweight Championship. Said won a unanimous decision to become the AFC bantamweight champion. During WFCA 35 he fought Anderson dos Santos. Following several jumping knees in the clinch, Said ended the fight by submission in the first round. In his final fight with World Fighting Championship Akhmat he won a unanimous decision against Luis Nogueira at WFC 42.

Ultimate Fighting Championship
Nurmagomedov made his promotional debut on July 14, 2018, at UFC Fight Night 133 against Justin Scoggins. He won the fight via split decision.

Nurmagomedov next faced Ricardo Ramos on February 2, 2019, at UFC Fight Night 144. He won the fight via TKO in the first round.

Nurmagomedov faced Raoni Barcelos on December 21, 2019, at UFC Fight Night 165. He lost the fight via unanimous decision.

Nurmagomedov faced promotional newcomer Mark Striegl, whose debut was delayed after testing positive for COVID-19, on October 18, 2020, at UFC Fight Night 180. He won the fight via knockout in round one.

Nurmagomedov was scheduled to face Jack Shore at UFC Fight Night 191 However, Nurmagomedov was pulled from the event due to visa issues, and was replaced by Zviad Lazishvili.

Nurmagomedov faced Cody Stamann on January 22, 2022, at UFC 270. He won the fight via submission in round one. This win earned him the Performance of the Night award.

Nurmagomedov faced  Douglas Silva de Andrade on July 9, 2022, at UFC on ESPN 39. He won the fight via unanimous decision.

Nurmagomedov faced Saidyokub Kakhramonov on December 17, 2022, at UFC Fight Night 216. He won the fight via submission in round two.

Nurmagomedov faced Jonathan Martinez on March 11, 2023, at UFC Fight Night 221. He lost the fight via unanimous decision. 13 out of 17 media outlets scored the bout as a victory for Nurmagomedov.

Championships and achievements
 Ultimate Fighting Championship
 Performance of the Night (One time) 
World Fighting Championship Akhmat
World Fighting Championship Akhmat Bantamweight Championship (One time)
MMAjunkie.com
January 2022 Submission of the Month (vs. Cody Stamann)

Mixed martial arts record
 

|-->
|-
|Loss
|align=center|17–3
|Jonathan Martinez
|Decision (unanimous)
|UFC Fight Night: Yan vs. Dvalishvili
|
|align=center|3
|align=center|5:00
|Las Vegas, Nevada, United States
|-->
|-
|Win
|align=center|17–2
|Saidyokub Kakhramonov
|Submission (ninja choke)
|UFC Fight Night: Cannonier vs. Strickland
| 
|align=center|2
|align=center|3:50
|Las Vegas, Nevada, United States
|
|-
|Win
|align=center|16–2
|Douglas Silva de Andrade
|Decision (unanimous)
|UFC on ESPN: dos Anjos vs. Fiziev
|
|align=center|3
|align=center|5:00
|Las Vegas, Nevada, United States
|
|-
|Win
|align=center|15–2
|Cody Stamann
|Submission (guillotine choke)
|UFC 270
|
|align=center|1
|align=center|0:47
|Anaheim, California, United States
|
|-
|Win
|align=center|14–2
|Mark Striegl
|KO (punches)
|UFC Fight Night: Ortega vs. The Korean Zombie
|
|align=center|1
|align=center|0:51
|Abu Dhabi, United Arab Emirates
|
|-
|Loss
|align=center|13–2
|Raoni Barcelos
|Decision (unanimous)
|UFC Fight Night: Edgar vs. The Korean Zombie
|
|align=center|3
|align=center|5:00
|Busan, South Korea
|
|-
|Win
|align=center|13–1
|Ricardo Ramos
|TKO (spinning back kick and punches)
|UFC Fight Night: Assunção vs. Moraes 2
|
|align=center|1
|align=center|2:28
|Fortaleza, Brazil
|
|-
|Win
|align=center|12–1
|Justin Scoggins
|Decision (split)
|UFC Fight Night: dos Santos vs. Ivanov
|
|align=center|3
|align=center|5:00
|Boise, Idaho, United States
|
|-
|Win
|align=center|11–1
|Luis Nogueira
|Decision (unanimous)
|WFCA 42
|
|align=center|3
|align=center|5:00
|Moscow, Russia
|
|-
|Win
|align=center|10–1
|Anderson dos Santos
|Submission (guillotine choke)
|WFCA 35
|
|align=center|1
|align=center|1:52
|Astana, Kazakhstan
|
|-
|Win
|align=center|9–1
|Abdul-Rakhman Dudaev
|Decision (unanimous)
|WFCA 30
|
|align=center|5
|align=center|5:00
|Grozny, Russia
|
|-
|Win
|align=center|8–1
|Walter Pereira Jr.
|Decision (unanimous)
|WFCA 22
|
|align=center|3
|align=center|5:00
|Grozny, Russia
|
|-
|Win
|align=center|7–1
|Diego Marlon
|Decision (unanimous)
|WFCA 16
|
|align=center|3
|align=center|5:00
|Grozny, Russia
|
|-
|Loss
|align=center|6–1
|Magomed Bibulatov
|Decision (unanimous)
|ACB 9: Grand Prix Berkut
|
|align=center|3
|align=center|5:00
|Grozny, Russia
|
|-
|Win
|align=center|6–0
|German Barsegyan
|TKO (doctor stoppage)
|ACB 7: Grand Prix Berkut
|
|align=center|1
|align=center|1:50
|Grozny, Russia
| 
|-
|Win
|align=center|5–0
|Magomed-Emin Hazhgeriev
|Decision (unanimous)
|ACB 4: Grand Prix Berkut
|
|align=center|2
|align=center|5:00
|Grozny, Russia
|
|-
|Win
|align=center|4–0
|Aslan Toktarbaev
|Decision (unanimous)
|ACB 1: Grand Prix Berkut
|
|align=center|2
|align=center|5:00
|Grozny, Russia
|
|-
|Win
|align=center|3–0
|Akhmed Sarapov
|KO (punch)
|Liga Kavkaz: Battle in Khiv 1
|
|align=center|1
|align=center|4:40
|Khiv, Russia
|
|-
|Win
|align=center|2–0
|Jolon Uulu Jayloobay
|Submission (armbar)
|Vale Tudo 3
|
|align=center|1
|align=center|1:35
|Moscow, Russia
|
|-
|Win
|align=center|1–0
|Oscar Nave
|Submission (armbar)
|World Ultimate Full Contact 15
|
|align=center|1
|align=center|2:03
|Viseu, Portugal
|
|-
|}

See also
 List of male mixed martial artists
 List of current UFC fighters

References

External links
 
 

1992 births
Living people
Russian male mixed martial artists
Dagestani mixed martial artists
Sportspeople from Makhachkala
Ultimate Fighting Championship male fighters